was a Japanese football player. He played for Japan national team.

Club career
Ueda was born in Kyoto Prefecture on August 3, 1947. After graduating from Hosei University, he joined Nippon Steel in 1970. He was selected Best Eleven in first season. He retired in 1973. He played 60 games and scored 25 goals in the league.

National team career
On August 2, 1970, Ueda debuted for Japan national team against South Korea. In December, he was selected Japan for 1970 Asian Games. He played at 1972 Summer Olympics qualification in 1971. This qualification was his last game for Japan. He played 13 games and scored 7 goals for Japan until 1971.

On April 15, 2015, Ueda died of lung cancer at the age of 67.

National team statistics

Awards
 Japan Soccer League Best Eleven: 1970

References

External links
 
 Japan National Football Team Database

1947 births
2015 deaths
Hosei University alumni
Association football people from Kyoto Prefecture
Japanese footballers
Japan international footballers
Japan Soccer League players
Nippon Steel Yawata SC players
Footballers at the 1970 Asian Games
Association football defenders
Asian Games competitors for Japan